Fumiyo Ikeda (Osaka, 1962) is a Japanese dancer, actress and choreographer.

Training
Fumiyo Ikeda was born in Osaka and grew up in Fukui, Japan. She started ballet at the age of ten. In 1979 she moved to Europe and started studying at Mudra, the Brussels dance school that was founded by Maurice Béjart. There she met Anne Teresa De Keersmaeker, whom she joined when she founded her dance company Rosas.

Collaboration with Anne Teresa De Keersmaeker / Rosas
Fumiyo Ikeda was involved in the creation of almost all Rosas productions from 1983 to 1992 and also was a dancer in them. In 1997 she joined Rosas again. Until 2008 she danced in most Rosas productions. Afterwards she went on tour with the restaging of older Rosas productions, such as Woud, Drumming, Elena's Aria and Mozart / Concert Arias. Un moto di gioia.

Work as a choreographer
Around the end of her second period at Rosas, Fumiyo Ikeda began to create work that is based on her own ideas. First she did that together with Alain Platel and Benjamin Verdonck in Nine Finger (2007), which is based on the book Beasts of No Nation by Uzodinma Iweala and shows the perversity of the war through the eyes of a child soldier. The production was selected for the Festival d'Avignon 2007.<ref name="nine_finger_desingel">Page about 'Nine Finger (2007)], on the website of deSingel</ref> A few years later in pieces (2009) followed, a performance she made with the British writer / performance artist Tim Etchells about memory, remembering and forgetting, and about how both are experienced and shown by the body and expressed in language.Page about in pieces (Fumiyo Ikeda and Tim Etchells, 2010), on the website of Monty Together with the Japanese dancer Un Yamada, she created in 2014 the dance duet amness, with organ music by Johann Sebastian Bach being played by the saxophonists of the Bl!ndman ensemble. In the same year she also created the production Cross Grip with the Japanese dancers Llon Kawai, Ayaka Azechi, Kota Kihara and the percussionist Kuniko Kato. Nine Finger (2007) was restaged in 2016; Stijn Opstaele replaced Benjamin Verdonck. In 2017 another dance performance followed: Piano and String Quartet, with a live performance by Ictus Ensemble of the composition Piano and String Quartet by Morton Feldman.Page about Piano and String Quartet (Fumiyo Ikeda and Ictus, 2017), on the website of the Kaaitheater

 Collaboration with others 
After her departure from Rosas around 1992, Fumiyo Ikeda began exploring new horizons. Before she had already collaborated with the American choreographer / dancer Steve Paxton.Pieter T'Jonck, Nieuwe ontwikkeling in Paxtons oeuvre: "Flip side" in repetitiezaal Kaaiteater, in: De Standaard, 23/01/1989 She participated in theater and film productions like Vinaya (Josse De Pauw and Peter van Kraaij, 1992), De meid slaan (Josse De Pauw and Tom Jansen, 1993),Pieter T'Jonck, Mannetjesputters onder elkaar: "De meid slaan" van Josse De Pauw en Tom Jansen, in: De Standaard, 19/02/1993 and Snakesong / Le voyeur (Jan Lauwers / Needcompany, 1994).Pieter T'Jonck, Needcompany speelt Alberto Moravia, in: De Standaard, 06/04/1994 Much later she worked with the Nature Theater of Oklahoma on the production Life & Times Episode 2 (2010).Page about Life & Times Episode 2 (Nature Theater of Oklahoma, 2010) on the website of the Kaaitheater More recently she worked on Absence (Eric Joris and Peter Verhelst / NTGent, 2015), and on De Sleutel (Josse De Pauw / LOD, 2016).

 Work as a teacher 
Besides dancing and choreographing, Fumiyo Ikeda also gives various workshops on her own work and the Rosas repertoire (including movement material from Rosas danst Rosas  and Drumming). She does this regularly at the Summer School of the dance school PARTS. Several times she was also a teacher at KASK, Ghent.Page about escape nightmare super-calm useless interaction silence again, on the website of KASK At Rosas she leads the rehearsals for the restaging of the early productions.

Productions
Own work:
 Nine Finger (Fumiyo Ikeda, Alain Platel and Benjamin Verdonck, 2007)
 in pieces (Fumiyo Ikeda and Tim Etchells, 2010)
 amness (Fumiyo Ikeda and Un Yamada, 2014)
 Piano and String Quartet (Fumiyo Ikeda and Ictus, 2017)

With Anne Teresa De Keersmaeker / Rosas:
 Rosas danst Rosas (Anne Teresa De Keersmaeker / Rosas, 1983)
 Elena's Aria (Anne Teresa De Keersmaeker / Rosas, 1984)
 Bartók / Aantekeningen (Anne Teresa De Keersmaeker / Rosas, 1986)
 Bartók / Mikrokosmos (Anne Teresa De Keersmaeker / Rosas, 1987)
 Ottone Ottone (Anne Teresa De Keersmaeker / Rosas, 1988) 
 Stella (Anne Teresa De Keersmaeker / Rosas, 1990) 
 Achterland (Anne Teresa De Keersmaeker / Rosas, 1990)
 Toccata (Anne Teresa De Keersmaeker / Rosas, 1993)
 Just before (Anne Teresa De Keersmaeker / Rosas, 1997)
 Drumming (Anne Teresa De Keersmaeker / Rosas, 1998)
 I said I (Anne Teresa De Keersmaeker / Rosas, 1999)
 In real time (Anne Teresa De Keersmaeker / Rosas / tg stan / AKA Moon, 2000)
 Rain (Anne Teresa De Keersmaeker / Rosas / Ictus, 2001)
 (but if a look should) April me (Anne Teresa De Keersmaeker / Rosas, 2002)
 Repertory Evening (Anne Teresa De Keersmaeker / Rosas, 2002)
 Bitches Brew / Tacoma Narrows (Anne Teresa De Keersmaeker / Rosas, 2003)
 Kassandra - speaking in twelve voices (Anne Teresa De Keersmaeker / Rosas, 2004)
 Raga for the Rainy Season / A Love Supreme (Anne Teresa De Keersmaeker / Rosas, 2005)
 D'un soir un jour (Anne Teresa De Keersmaeker / Rosas, 2006)
 Zeitung (Anne Teresa De Keersmaeker / Rosas / Alain Franco, 2008)

With others:
 Flip Side (Steve Paxton, 1989)
 De meid slaan (Josse De Pauw and Tom Jansen, 1993)
 Snakesong / Le voyeur (Jan Lauwers / Needcompany, 1994)
 Life & Times Episode 2 (Nature Theater of Oklahoma, 2010)
 Absence (Eric Joris and Peter Verhelst / NTGent, 2015)
 De Sleutel (Josse De Pauw / LOD, 2016)

Filmography
With Rosas:
 Répétitions (Marie André, 1985)Early Works - Films and documentaries, on the website of Rosas
 Hoppla! (Wolfgang Kolb, 1989)
 Monoloog van Fumiyo Ikeda op het einde van Ottone, Ottone (Walter Verdin, 1989)
 Ottone / Ottone (part I and II) (Walter Verdin and Anne Teresa De Keersmaeker, 1991)
 Rosa (Peter Greenaway, 1992)
 Achterland (Anne Teresa De Keersmaeker and Herman Van Eyken, 1994)
 Counter Phrases (Thierry De Mey, 2004)

With others:
 Solum solum, alleen maar aarde (Bie Boeykens, 1992)
 Vinaya (Josse De Pauw and Peter van Kraaij, 1992)

 References 

Further reading

 Peter Anthonissen, NINE FINGER, in: Trends, 18 /01/2007, p. 105
 Michaël Bellon, Het verhaal van de Negen Vinger, in: Brussel Deze Week, 14/01/2007
 Pierre Darge, Fumiyo Ikeda, in: Knack/Weekend Knack, 01/08/2007, p. 28
 Tuur Devens, De complexiteit van de liefde in verstilde, fragiele schoonheid, in: De Theaterkrant, 03/03/2016
 Guy Duplat, [https://web.archive.org/web/20180224151611/http://www.lalibre.be/culture/scenes/l-art-et-l-enfant-soldat-51b8918ce4b0de6db9af103b L'art et l'enfant-soldat, in: La Libre Belgique/édition nationale, 16/01/2007, p. 3
 Guy Duplat, Le cri halluciné de l'enfant, in: La Libre Belgique/édition nationale, 19/01/ 2007, p. 1 
 Guy Duplat, Danser la mémoire de la vie et du corps, in: La Libre Belgique/édition nationale, 04/06/2009, p. 30
 Guy Duplat, Fumiyo pleine d'émotions, in: La Libre Belgique/édition nationale, 13/06/2009, p. 38
 Wouter Hillaert, Ik wil voorstellingen maken die lang blijven nazinderen, in: De Standaard, 04/06/2009, p. 64
 Geert Sels, Ik heb bijna alles meegemaakt, en deed het allemaal even graag, in: De Standaard, 17/01/2007, p. 38
 Geert Sels, Alles zit binnenstebuiten in Nine finger, in: De Standaard, 23/01/2007, p. 26
 Pieter T'Jonck, Benieuwd hoe mensen zullen reageren op de gruwel: Rosasdanseres Fumiyo Ikeda maakt productie over kindsoldaten, in: De Morgen, 17/01/2007
 Pieter T'Jonck, Dansen of acteren?, in: De Morgen, 23/01/2007
 Pieter T'Jonck, Subliem en gruwelijk, in: De Morgen, 24/01/2007
 Pieter T'Jonck, Echt iets nieuws brengen kan niet, in: De Morgen, 02/06/2009, p. 22
 Pieter T'Jonck, Grillige wezens'', in: De Morgen, 28/04/2014, p. 24
  Els Van Steenberghe, ''Josse De Pauw beeldhouwt de smachtende stilte in 'De sleutel''', in: Knack, 24/02/2016
 Fumiyo Ikeda over Amness, in: Cobra.be, 13/02/2014
 ''Fumiyo Ikeda & Jean-Luc Fafchamps: Interview over 'Piano and String Quartet''', op de website van Ictus
 Flemish Arts Institute - Persons - Fumiyo Ikeda according to the Flemish Arts Institute

Japanese choreographers
Japanese female dancers
Living people
1962 births